Emily Matchar (born 1982) is an American journalist and author. Originally from Chapel Hill, North Carolina, she graduated from Harvard University in 2004. Her work has appeared in The Atlantic, Salon, The Washington Post, Time, The New Republic, Gourmet, and Outside, among others.  Her non-fiction book, Homeward Bound: Why Women Are Embracing the New Domesticity was a critical exploration of the cultural phenomenon of "new domesticity," the re-embrace of old-fashioned domestic arts and practices from knitting to canning to backyard chicken-raising. It was published by Simon & Schuster in 2013 and received favorable reviews from The New Yorker, The New Republic, and The Washington Post, among many others, and was given 3.5 out of 4 stars by People Magazine.  She has made numerous appearances on TV and radio, including The Colbert Report, Good Morning America, MSNBC's The Cycle, NPR, and the BBC.
Matchar lives with her husband in Hong Kong and Chapel Hill, North Carolina.

References 

Living people
1982 births
Harvard University alumni
People from Chapel Hill, North Carolina
The Atlantic (magazine) people
The Washington Post journalists
American women journalists
21st-century American women